Lloyd Mathias is an Indian business executive and an entrepreneur. He worked as a Chief Marketing Officer at HP Inc., Motorola. He was also the Chief Marketing Officer and the President at Tata Teleservices.

Early life and education
Mathias did his master's degree in Management Studies from Somaiya Institute of Management, Mumbai University. He did his graduation from St Xavier's College, Mumbai.

Career
Mathias joined PepsiCo India as the marketing head in 1994. In 2005, he quit from PepsiCo and joined Motorola as the Senior Director, head of sales and operations in India and South West Asia. He worked in Motorola for three years and resigned in 2008. In the same year, he joined the Tata Teleservices as president and CMO. In 2010, he was elected as the chairman of Media Research Users Council (MRUC). Then, in 2011, he left Tata Teleservices. In 2013, he was elected as Co-Chairperson of CDG's Device Strategy Council. In 2014, he joined HP Inc. as the Chief Marketing Officer.

References

Living people
20th-century Indian businesspeople
Year of birth missing (living people)
Place of birth missing (living people)
Motorola employees
Indian business executives
Indian social entrepreneurs
St. Xavier's College, Mumbai alumni